Project Avocado is a standing Presidential authorization  which allows U.S. military combatant commanders to assemble task forces for almost any purpose, drawing resources from any military unit.  President Obama authorized Project Avocado in the summer of 2009, with a view towards widening U.S. counter-terrorism activities and powers, under the advisory of former General Stanley A. McChrystal, then the Director of Operations of the U.S. Joint Chiefs of Staff.  Project Avocado provides unprecedented military powers to U.S. operational commanders to conduct unconventional warfare throughout the world.

In May 2010, it was reported that a Joint Unconventional Warfare Task Force Execute Order had been signed on 30 September 2010, by General David Petraeus.  This order was signed in secret, provided sweeping new powers to military and intelligence agencies for information-gathering in the Middle-East, Horn of Africa and other regions unspecified.  The Order focused on intelligence gathering — by American troops, foreign businesspeople, academics or others — to identify militants and provide “persistent situational awareness,” while forging ties to local indigenous groups. The order did not authorize offensive strikes in any specific countries.

The Petraeus Joint Unconventional Warfare Task Force Execute Order allows the U.S. military to insert American personnel into Iran, which is now authorized under Project Avocado, a particularly unprecedented power which was not authorized under prior U.S. presidential administrations.

Project Avocado is now known under another name; that name is not publicly known.

References 

Counterterrorism in the United States